Posey may refer to:

Places
 Posey, California
 Posey, Illinois
 Posey, Texas
 Posey, West Virginia
 Posey County, Indiana
 Posey Township, Indiana (disambiguation)

People
 Posey (Paiute) (1860s–1923), Paiute chief
 Posey (surname)
 Posey G. Lester (1850–1929), American politician
 Posey Rorer (1891–1936), an old-time musician

Other uses
 Posey House (disambiguation)
 Posey vest, a type of medical restraint

See also
 
 Posie or nosegay